West Lynn Creamery, Inc. v. Healy, 512 U.S. 186 (1994), was a United States Supreme Court case.

Background

Facts
After milk prices plummeted, the Massachusetts Department of Food and Agriculture issued a pricing order that taxed all the raw milk sold by milk dealers to Massachusetts retailers and dispersed the revenue as a subsidy to Massachusetts dairy farmers. The order, which was designed to aid only Massachusetts milk producers, required dealers to pay into a fund monthly payments that were determined by subtracting from $ 15 the monthly federal blend price for 100 pounds of raw milk. Although approximately two-thirds of such milk was produced outside Massachusetts, the entire fund was distributed monthly to Massachusetts dairy farmers according to each farmer's proportionate contribution to the state's total production of raw milk. 

Two licensed Massachusetts milk dealers, who purchased raw milk outside of Massachusetts but did business in Massachusetts, 
refused to make the payments required under the pricing order, and Massachusetts commenced license revocation proceedings against the dealers.

The dealers then sought an injunction against enforcement of the order on the ground that the order violated the Federal Constitution's commerce clause (Art I, 8, cl 3).

Procedural history
The Superior Court of Suffolk County, Massachusetts, denied relief, and a Massachusetts official conditionally revoked the dealers' licenses.

The Supreme Judicial Court of Massachusetts, expressing the view that the local benefits provided to the Massachusetts dairy industry by the pricing order outweighed any incidental burden on interstate commerce, affirmed the Superior Court judgment.

Opinion of the Court
On certiorari, the United States Supreme Court reversed. Justice Stevens wrote for the majority, joined by Justices O'Connor, Kennedy, Souter, and Ginsburg.

He determined that the pricing order violated the commerce clause, where (1) the avowed purpose and undisputed effect of the order were to enable higher-cost Massachusetts dairy farmers to compete with lower-cost dairy farmers in other states; (2) the tax was effectively imposed on only out-of-state products; (3) the order would almost certainly cause local goods to constitute a larger share, and goods with an out-of-state source to constitute a smaller share, of the total sales in the market; (4) by distributing monies directly to Massachusetts dairy farmers, the order insured that Massachusetts producers would benefit; (5) the order was unconstitutional even if (a) the tax on milk sales and the subsidy to Massachusetts dairy farmers would each be constitutional standing alone, (b) the dealers who paid the tax were not competitors of the farmers who received disbursements from the fund, and (c) the costs of the program imposed under the order were borne by only Massachusetts dealers and consumers; and (6) the order's burden on commerce could not be justified by the local benefit preserving the Massachusetts dairy industry.

Negative Commerce Clause jurisprudence had long forbidden state tariffs because they discriminated against interstate commerce by burdening out-of-state competitors to the benefit of in-state businesses. The Court explained that a state could not use its legitimate powers to tax and to subsidize state businesses to effect the illegitimate aim of imposing what was in effect a tariff. The Court held that a nondiscriminatory tax had been coupled with a legitimate subsidy to create an effect that nonetheless violated the Commerce Clause.

Thus, the Court reversed the state supreme court's order, which had upheld a pricing order by the Massachusetts Department of Food and Agriculture to tax milk produced out-of-state and to distribute the proceeds to in-state dairy farmers. The Court held that the order violated the negative Commerce Clause because, like a tariff, it benefitted in-state economic interests by burdening out-of-state competitors, such as the milk buyers.

Concurrence
Justice Scalia, concurred, joined by Justice Thomas.

He argued that (1) a self-executing negative commerce clause should be enforced against a state law that (a) facially discriminates against interstate commerce, or (b) is indistinguishable from a type of law previously held unconstitutional by the Supreme Court; and (2) applying this approach, or at least the second part of it, the pricing order was invalid.

Dissent
Chief Justice Rehnquist dissented, joined by Justice Blackmun.

He stated that no decided case supported the court's conclusion that the negative commerce clause prohibits a state from using money that it has lawfully obtained through a neutral tax on milk dealers and distributing the money as a subsidy to dairy farmers.

See also 
 Agricultural Marketing Agreement Act of 1937, 7 U.S.C.S. § 601 et seq.

References 

United States Constitution Article One case law
United States Supreme Court cases
United States Supreme Court cases of the Rehnquist Court
United States Dormant Commerce Clause case law
1994 in United States case law
History of Suffolk County, Massachusetts
Dairy farming in the United States